Kate McAll is Executive Producer, Radio Drama at BBC Wales. There she is a radio director and producer for BBC Radio 3 and Radio 4.   Her credits include How I Live Now (Radio 3) and The Worst Journey in the World (Radio 4), along with seven Torchwood radio episodes.

Radio Plays

Sources:
 Kate McAll's radio play listing at Diversity website
 Kate McAll's radio play listing at RadioListings website

References

BBC Radio drama directors
BBC radio producers
British radio directors
Women radio directors
Living people
Year of birth missing (living people)
Women radio producers